John Whitford may refer to:

 John Whitford (priest) (d. 1667), Anglican priest and son of Walter Whitford
 John Whitford (RAF officer) (1892–1966), Royal Air Force officer in the Mediterranean Allied Air Forces
 John Whitford (racing driver), American racing driver on the List of NASCAR Cup Series champions
 John Whitford (judge) (1913–2001), British judge